eMeta Corporation was a company that provided access control, subscription management and ecommerce solutions for media, entertainment and software companies. It was founded in 1998 and headquartered in New York City. eMeta was taken over by Macrovision Corporation in 2006. Macrovision sold the eMeta operations to Atypon in November 2008.

The eMeta suite of software products, consisting of RightAccess and RightCommerce, helps customers like McGraw-Hill, NYTimes.com and Wolters Kluwer license and sell digital assets, including text, audio, video, streaming media, games and software applications (SaaS).

Products and services

RightAccess

RightAccess is the access control module within the eMeta suite, providing advanced authentication, authorization, administration, registration and licensing functionality for all types of digital goods and services. RightAccess allows companies to manage how customers access online offerings.

RightCommerce

RightCommerce is the ecommerce module within the eMeta suite, making it easy to market and sell digital products. Designed for complex digital goods billing and subscription management, it allows companies to target customers with free trials, discounts or gift subscriptions – while increasing incremental or add-on purchases with promotions and targeted pricing. Customer care features, including self-care, improve customer satisfaction.

eRightsWEB

eRightsWEB is the ASP, or software as a service (SaaS), version of the eMeta suite, giving smaller organizations the opportunity to benefit from an access control and ecommerce system.

Notable customers

Celera Genomics
CNN.com
Elsevier
FT.com
Hoover's, Inc. (US and UK)
iVillage.com
Knight Ridder Digital
McGraw-Hill Higher Education
NASCAR.com
NYTimes.com
Oxford University Press
ProQuest Information and Learning
Reuters
SmartMoney.com
Turner
The Globe and Mail
Wolters Kluwer

References

Software companies based in New York City
Software companies established in 1998
Companies disestablished in 2006
Defunct software companies of the United States
Defunct companies based in New York (state)
1998 establishments in New York City